Michele Perniola (born 6 September 1998), known also as 3x3n, is an Italian singer, best known for representing San Marino at the Junior Eurovision Song Contest 2013 with his song "O-o-O Sole Intorno a Me" (O-o-O Sunlight all around me). He also represented San Marino in the Eurovision Song Contest 2015 with Anita Simoncini. They performed the song "Chain of Lights".

Life and work
Michele Perniola was born on 6 September 1998 in Palagiano, a small town in the province of Taranto, Italy.

Career

2012: Ti lascio una canzone

In December 2012, Perniola won the sixth edition of the popular Italian TV series Ti lascio una canzone, thus rising to fame.  Ever since his victory, Perniola started having fans not only in Italy, but also in the United States and China.

2013: Junior Eurovision Song Contest

Even though the rules of Junior Eurovision say that lead performers must be nationals or have lived in that country for at least two years, the EBU gave special permission to children aged 10–15 of either Sanmarinese or Italian nationality. Michele Perniola was internally selected to represent San Marino at the 11th Junior Eurovision Song Contest on 30 November 2013 with his song "O-o-O Sole Intorno a Me". The song placed 10th in a field of 12 songs, scoring 42 points.

2014–present: Eurovision Song Contest

On 18 April 2014, it was announced that Perniola would read the points for San Marino at the 59th Eurovision Song Contest.  Despite the fact that he was born in September 1998, the EBU gave him special permission to be announcer of the votes for the microstate.

SMRTV revealed that Perniola and Anita Simoncini would represent  at the Eurovision Song Contest 2015 during a press conference on 27 November 2014. Perniola previously represented San Marino in the Junior Eurovision Song Contest 2013 while Simoncini represented the nation in the 2014 Junior Contest as part of the group The Peppermints.

Perniola has said that he only learned he would be singing a duet with Simoncini while driving in the car to the press conference announcing it.

Discography

Singles

References

1998 births
Eurovision Song Contest entrants of 2015
Eurovision Song Contest entrants for San Marino
People from the Province of Taranto
Italian child singers
Italian pop singers
Junior Eurovision Song Contest entrants
Living people
21st-century Italian male singers